Osrečje is a settlement southwest of Škocjan in Lower Carniola in southeastern Slovenia. Within the Municipality of Škocjan, it belongs to the Local Community of Škocjan. The Municipality of Škocjan is included in the Southeast Slovenia Statistical Region.

References

External links
Osrečje at Geopedia

Populated places in the Municipality of Škocjan